Gopalasamudram is a village in the Pattukkottai taluk of Thanjavur district, Tamil Nadu, India.

Demographics 

As per the 2001 census, Gopalasamudram had a total population of 501 with 267 males and 234 females. The sex ratio was 876. The literacy rate was 66.74.

References 

 

Villages in Thanjavur district